Alstroemeria pulchella is a scientific name that may refer to the following plants commonly referred to as Peruvian lilies:

Alstroemeria pulchella H.Vilm. (1866) — synonym of A. aurea
Alstroemeria pulchella L.f. (1782) — synonym of A. pelegrina
Alstroemeria pulchella L.f. (1782) — a misapplied name of A. psittacina, the New Zealand Christmas bell
Alstroemeria pulchella Sims (1822) — synonym of A. ligtu subsp. simsii

Alstroemeria